Brit Awards 1991  was the 11th edition of the Brit Awards, an annual pop music awards ceremony in the United Kingdom. It was organised by the British Phonographic Industry and took place on 10 February 1991 at Dominion Theatre in London. It was produced by Jonathan King.

Performances
 Adamski with Seal – "Killer"
 The Beautiful South – "A Little Time"
 Betty Boo – "Where Are You Baby?"
 The Cure – "Never Enough"
 EMF – "Unbelievable"
 Status Quo – Medley of Hits "Caroline"/ "Down Down"/ "Whatever You Want"/ "Rockin' All Over The World"

Winners and nominees

Outstanding Contribution to Music
 Status Quo

Multiple nominations and awards
The following artists received multiple awards and/or nominations.

References

External links
Brit Awards 1991 at Brits.co.uk

Brit Awards
Brit Awards, 1991
Brit Awards, 1991
Brit Awards
Brit
Brit Awards